The Philip Moore Stone House is located on Ohio State Route 239 in Washington Township, Scioto County, Ohio. The property was placed on the National Register on 1975-10-21.

The house is now available for rental and is open to the public on select days.

References

External links
 Philip Moore, Jr. Stone House - official site

Houses on the National Register of Historic Places in Ohio
Houses in Scioto County, Ohio
National Register of Historic Places in Scioto County, Ohio
Stone houses in Ohio
Museums in Scioto County, Ohio
Historic house museums in Ohio